The VEF I-11 (also called the Irbītis I-11) was a Latvian light aircraft built by VEF.

Design and development 
The I-11 was designed by Kārlis Irbītis in 1936.  It was a low-wing monoplane with a two-seat tandem cockpit and fixed conventional landing gear. On the basis of the I-11, Irbītis designed the training fighter I-12.

Operational history 
On June 23, 1936, the I-11 made its maiden flight.

On April 26, 1937, it flew a  flight around Latvia in  hours.

See also 
Related development
 VEF I-12

References

1930s Latvian aircraft
Low-wing aircraft
Single-engined tractor aircraft
VEF aircraft